Sulaymaniyah or Sulaymaniyya is a city in Iraq.

Sulaymaniyah may also refer to:

Sulaymaniyah District
Sulaymaniyah (football club)
Sulaymaniyah Governorate
Sulaymaniyah incident
Sulaymaniyah International Airport
Sulaymaniyah Mosque
Sulaymaniyah Museum
Sulaymaniyah Stadium
Sulaymaniyya Takiyya

See also
 Soleymaniyeh (disambiguation)
 Süleymaniye (disambiguation)